NBA Wednesday is a weekly presentation of the National Basketball Association on ESPN. Debuting in 2002, NBA Wednesday starts the first Wednesday of the NBA season and runs throughout the entire regular season. Games typically air at 9:30 p.m. EST, following the network's presentation of ACC Wednesday college basketball. NBA Wednesday is occasionally preempted by ACC Wednesday or other college basketball doubleheaders.(otherwise it will air doubleheaders like NBA Friday at 7:30 and 10 pm et respectfully)

NBA Wednesday, like NBA Friday, is not exclusive; local sports networks may still air the game in their market. In that case, the ESPN broadcast on these markets is subject to blackout and ESPNEWS programming is usually aired instead.

History
Originally, NBA Wednesday was broadcast by Brad Nessler and Bill Walton each week. After the 2002-2003 NBA season, ESPN ceased having a consistent broadcast team for NBA Wednesday until 2007–08, in which they used Dan Shulman and Jon Barry.

Studio features
Unlike other NBA on ESPN games, a version of Sports Center hosted by Stephen A. Smith is used as the pregame studio program for ESPN's Wednesday NBA games.

Scott Van Pelt hosts the halftime show. Van Pelt's full Sports Center is also used as a defacto post game show and lead out.

Personalities

In the 2022 season, ESPN introduced several new personalities to the network's weekday NBA programming. There are several broadcast teams but no one group is assigned specifically to NBA Wednesday. The network's "A-team" consists of Mike Breen, Mark Jackson, and Jeff Van Gundy, a trio that is usually assigned to the more "premiere" matchup in a doubleheader.

Play-by-play announcers
 Mike Breen
 Mark Jones
 Dave Pasch
 Ryan Ruocco
 Brian Custer
 Beth Mowins

Color commentators
 Jeff Van Gundy
 Mark Jackson
 Richard Jefferson
 Vince Carter
 Hubie Brown
 Doris Burke

Sideline reporters
 Lisa Salters
 Cassidy Hubbarth
 Malika Andrews
 Jorge Sedano
 Rosalyn Gold-Onwude
 Katie George

References

ESPN original programming
2010s American television series
2020s American television series
2002 American television series debuts
Wednesday
Wednesday